The Toppserien is the top level of women's association football in Norway. It was founded in 1984.

History
Women's league football was introduced on a county basis in 1977. These leagues acted as qualification for the regional (South) league in 1979. Regional leagues were in operation until the formation of the First Division 1984, when the league was divided into three regions, Group Eastern-Norway (Østlandet), Group Western-Norway (Vestlandet), and Group Mid-Norway (Trøndelag). No teams from Northern-Norway (Nord-Norge) played, however. The winners of the three groups met each other for a play-off. Regional leagues for women had been played before 1984, and a championship play-off had been done between the winners of Mid-Norway and Eastern-Norway in 1983 (Trondheims-Ørn beat Setskog 2-1), but this championship was considered unofficial by the Football Association of Norway. In 1986, a group for Northern-Norway was added, and in 1987, the groups and play-off matches were dropped, and one single league with teams from all over the country was played.

The league was known as 1. divisjon (Norwegian for 1st Division) from 1984 to 1995, the Eliteserien (Norwegian for The Elite League) from 1996 to 1999, and the Toppserien (Norwegian for The Top League) from 2000.

Traditionally, Trondheims-Ørn and Asker was the two power-houses of Toppserien, with 7 and 6 championship wins respectively. Trondheims-Ørn finished in the top three 16 out of 23 times from the beginning in 1984 to their current last medal in 2006. In 1998, Asker managed the almost unthinkable, winning every single one of their 18 league games that season (Asker didn't win the double that season, however, as the club was knocked out of the semi-finals of the cup by Trondheims-Ørn). However Asker FK, the women's team within Asker Fotball, became bankrupt at the end of 2008 and most of the players were transferred to a new team within the nearby Stabæk IF, named Stabæk FK (FK = Fotball Kvinner (Football Women)).  Asker finished among the top three 18 out of the 25 seasons the club existed. The new Stabæk team began playing in the Toppserien from the 2009 season and won the league in 2010 and 2013. Røa won Toppserien five times from 2004 to 2011. Lillestrøm SK Kvinner won six consecutive titles from 2014 to 2019.

The league
The league currently consists of 12 teams, which play each other 2 times (home and away), for a total of 22 matches. The season lasts from April to October. Teams are ranked by: 
 Number of points (3 points per win, 1 point per draw).
 Goal difference
 Goals scored
 Results between the tied teams.

2022 teams

Notes

Winner by year
The following medals have been awarded:

List of champions
Below is a list of the gold, silver and bronze medalists in the Toppserien since its beginning in 1984. The Norwegian Women's Cup has been played since 1978. From 1984 to 1995 the name of the league was 1. divisjon ("First Division"), and between 1996 and 1999 the name was Eliteserien ("The Elite League", a generic name) before getting its current name, Toppserien in 2000.

From 1984 to 1985, the league was divided into three sections, and after the inclusion of teams from Northern Norway there was four sections in 1986, with the championship decided through a play-off. Since then it has been a round-robin decided through a league table.

Winners by club
The following clubs have won the top division in Norwegian football since 1984.

1 = In 2008 Stabæk was handed the license to play in the top league, and also took over the best players from Asker, because of financial problems in the latter. But the rest of Asker remains, and they still have their top female team - in league three. Therefore, Stabæk is not to be considered the successor of Asker.
2 = Athene Moss was Sprint/Jeløy successor, so one bronze as Athene Moss in 1998 is included.
3 = LSK Kvinner is the successor of Setskog/Høland and Team Strømmen.
4 = Rosenborg is the successor of Trondheims-Ørn.
5 = Brann is the successor of Sandviken.

See also
List of football clubs in Norway
Eliteserien (men's top division)

References

External links
League at toppserien.no
League at nrk.no

 
1984 establishments in Norway
Sports leagues established in 1984
1
Nor
Professional sports leagues in Norway